Six Codes (六法) refers to the six main legal codes that make up the main body of law in Japan, South Korea, and the Republic of China (Taiwan). Sometimes, the term is also used to describe the six major areas of law. Furthermore, it may refer to all or part of a collection of statutes.

The word roppō is a slightly adapted form of the word used in Japanese to describe the Napoleonic Code (ナポレオン五法典 Napoleon go-hōten) when it was brought over during the early Meiji period. Although, French Emperor Napoleon enacted five major codes, which were, in Japanese, altogether metonymically referred to as "the Napoleonic Code" (the official name of the Civil Code, the first and most prominent one), the Japanese added to this their own constitution to form six codes in all, and thus it came to be called the roppō or "six codes."

Legislation in Japan tends to be terse. The statutory volume Roppō Zensho (literally: Book of Six Codes), similar in size to a large dictionary, contains all six codes as well as many other statutes enacted by the Diet.

The Six Codes were introduced to China in 1905 after the reform and modernization of the Chinese legal system led by Cixi. Such reform was based on the similar laws adopted in Germany, France, and Japan. After the establishment of Nationalist Government, the Complete Book of Six Codes was passed on October 3 1928. The Chinese Communist Party abolished the practices of Six Codes on the land of Communist control in February 1949.

As a result of Japanese colonial rule and the Retreat of the Republic of China to Taiwan, the legal system in Taiwan is strongly influenced by Japan and China. As a result, the terms Six Codes and Book of Six Codes are also widely used in Taiwan.

See also

External links
 Ministry of Justice, ROC (Taiwan)
 The Laws and Regulations Database of the ROC (Taiwan)
 The Complete Six Codes of Japan ＲＯＮの六法全書 onLINE (in Japanese)

References

Civil law legal terminology
Japanese legislation
Law of South Korea
Law of Taiwan